William Alexander D'Arcy (30 January 1863 – 23 October 1940) was a New Zealand cricketer who played one first-class match for Taranaki. He was born in Ōrongorongo and died in Wanganui, aged 77.

See also
 List of Taranaki representative cricketers

External links 
  from Cricinfo.
  from CricketArchive.

1863 births
1940 deaths
New Zealand people of Irish descent
New Zealand cricketers
Taranaki cricketers